Cyfer is a surname. Notable people with the surname include:

LoUis CYfer, stage name as drag king of Lucy Jane Parkinson
Adrian Cyfer, Polish speedway rider in 2015 Individual Speedway Junior World Championship and other competitions